The Château d'Angoulême was a castle in the town of Angoulême, in the Charente département of France. The only remaining parts are the keep of Lusignan and the tower of Valois, which are part of the Town Hall of Angoulême, together with a construction of the 19th century.

History
The rocky outcrop which dominates the river Charente and the Anguienne had been a strategical position for a long time. The first fortress on this site was built at the end of the Roman Empire. A rampart protecting a 27 ha area has been maintained until the 13th century. The medieval castle was founded in around 886 by Count Alduin.

From the 10th to the 13th century, the Counts of Angoulême, the Taillifer then the Lusignan, strengthened the fortifications of the town, and enlarged them to include the Saint-Martial quarter.

Important additions to the castle were undertaken by Hugh X of Lusignan in 1226. In 1308, after the death of Guy de Lusignan, the county of Angoulême returned to the French Crown. It was then given to Louis d'Orléans in 1394, and then fell by inheritance to his son Jean de Valois, grandfather of Marguerite d'Angoulême and Francis I.

The duke of Épernon, governor of Angoumois, received Marie de' Medici when she escaped in 1619. After, the castle became the residence of the governors.

In 1840, the town bought the castle to house the Town Hall. The mayor, Paul Joseph Normand de la Tranchade, commissioned the architect Paul Abadie to develop the project, who dismantled a portion of the medieval buildings. The keep and a tower were preserved thanks to the pressure of the Archaeological and Historical Society of Charente.

Description of the castle

The present remains including the polygonal keep, called Tour de Lusignan, the châtelet, and the round Valois Tower date from the 12th to 15th centuries. The polygonal keep was built 1282–1302, and the Valois Tower was built in the late 15th century. During the 15th century, a square pavillon was added to the Tour Marguerite. This pavillon included a polygonal turret containing the staircase.

At the end of the 15th century were constructed star shaped fortifications; two turrets remained in rue Bélat and rue du Sauvage.

The medieval parts of the castle have been listed as monument historique by the French Ministry of Culture since 1929, and the complete town hall since 2013.

See also
 List of castles in France

Bibliography 
Châteaux manoirs logis, la Charente, éditions patrimoines et médias 1993,

References

External links 
 Picture of the Castle of prior to its demolition
 

Ruined castles in Nouvelle-Aquitaine
Angoulême
Monuments historiques of Charente